Chinese Astronomy may refer to :
 Chinese astronomy, the history of Chinese knowledge and scientific culture about astronomy.
 Chinese Astronomy, a periodic scientific journal.